Sky Without Stars is a 1955 West German drama film directed by Helmut Käutner and starring Erik Schumann, Eva Kotthaus and Horst Buchholz.

The film's sets were designed by the art director Hans Berthel and Robert Stratil. It was shot at the Bavaria Studios in Munich.

Cast
Erik Schumann as Carl Altmann
Eva Kotthaus as Anna Kaminski
Horst Buchholz as Mischa Bjelkin
Georg Thomalla as Willi Becker
Gustav Knuth as Otto Friese
Camilla Spira as Elsbeth Friese
Erich Ponto as Vater Otto Kaminski
Lucie Höflich as Mutter Mathilde Kaminski
Rainer Stang as Jochen
Siegfried Lowitz as Hüske
Otto Wernicke as Inspektor Hoffmann
Wolfgang Neuss as Vopo Edgar Bröse
Paul Bildt as Direktor Klütsch
Beppo Schwaiger as Inspektor Henning
Joseph Offenbach as Polizei-Offizier
Pinkas Braun as Kommissar Engelbrecht
Rolf Gottwald as Vopo
Edith Hancke as Frau am Kontrollpunkt
Lina Carstens
Helmut Käutner as Speaker

References

External links

1955 drama films
German drama films
West German films
Films directed by Helmut Käutner
Cold War films
Films shot at Bavaria Studios
Films set in East Germany
German black-and-white films
1950s German films
1950s German-language films